Anne Dunn (born 4 September, 1929) is an English artist associated with the second generation of the School of London.

Background and education
Born in London, England, Dunn is the daughter of the Canadian steel magnate Sir James Dunn, 1st baronet (1874–1956) and his second wife, Irene Clarice Richards, a former musical-comedy actress who had previous been married to Francis Douglas, 11th Marquess of Queensberry.

Dunn studied in London at Chelsea School of Art (1949–50) and at the Anglo-French Centre (1952) under Henry Moore and guest artist Fernand Léger before going to the Académie Julian in Paris, France in 1952.

Career
Dunn's art has been exhibited in Europe and North America and can be seen at the Beaverbrook Art Gallery in Fredericton, New Brunswick, the Arts Council Collection in London, and many private collections. Two drawings and two paintings are in the Government Art Collection.

Her first solo show was at the Leicester Galleries of London in 1957, with subsequent shows there in 1959, 1960, 1962, and 1964. Thereafter her major exhibitions took place in New York with shows at the Fischbach Gallery in 1967, 1969, 1972, 1975, 1977, 1979, 1982, 1985, 1987, and 1989.

From 1964 to 1968 she edited the journal Art and Literature with Rodrigo Moynihan, Sonia Orwell and John Ashbery.

In 1990 Dunn had a solo show at the Christopher Hull Gallery in London. Her most recent solo show was in 2005 at the Tibor de Nagy Gallery in New York.

A taped interview with the artist is held by the National Life Story Collection at the British Library Sound Archive.

Personal life
Dunn's first husband was the artist Michael Wishart (1928–1996); they were married for 10 years before divorcing, and had one son. Michael Wishart's autobiography High Diver (1977) is dedicated to her and gives a picture of the artist as a young woman.

Immediately after she and Wishart divorced in 1960, Dunn married Anglo-Spanish artist Rodrigo Moynihan (1910–1990), as his second wife. They had a son together and Dunne gained a stepson through the marriage. 

She has been painted and drawn by many fellow artists including Joe Brainard, Lucian Freud, and Rodrigo Moynihan.

Dunn has links with France, Switzerland and New York City, but spends parts of her summers at a retreat on the Nigadoo River near Bathurst, New Brunswick.

References

1929 births
Living people
20th-century English painters
21st-century English painters
Académie Julian alumni
Daughters of baronets